Bear River Winery is a winery in Meadow Vista, California in the United States.

History
Bear River Winery was created by Jeff Evans and Mike Walker in the late 2000s.  Bear River Winery produced its first official commercial production in 2009 and officially opened the Tasting Room at the winery in Meadow Vista in 2013.  

The Winery received its name from the Bear River which flows nearby and is viewable in the winter months.

Production

Awards
2018
 2012 Barbera – Bronze Medal, 2018 California State Fair Commercial Wine Competition
 2012 Grizzly Syrah – Bronze Medal, 2018 California State Fair Commercial Wine Competition
 2014 Merlot – Bronze Medal, 2018 California State Fair Commercial Wine Competition
 2014 Cabernet Sauvignon – Bronze Medal, 2018 California State Fair Commercial Wine Competition
 2014 Primitivo – Bronze Medal, 2018 California State Fair Commercial Wine Competition
 2014 Beardeaux “Right Paw” – Bronze Medal, 2018 California State Fair Commercial Wine Competition

 2014 Beardeaux “Right Paw” – Silver Medal, 2018 SF Chronicle Wine Competition
 2014 Merlot – Bronze Medal, 2018 SF Chronicle Wine Competition
 2014 Primitivo – Silver Medal, 2018 SF Chronicle Wine Competition

2016
 2012 Barbera – Silver Medal 2016 SF Chronicle Wine Competition

2015
 2013 Barbera Rosé – Silver Medal, 2015 SF Chronicle Wine Competition
 2012 Syrah – Bronze Medal, 2015 SF Chronicle Wine Competition

 2010 Barbera Rosé – Bronze Medal, 2014 SF Chronicle Wine Competition
 2010 Late Harvest Barbera – Bronze Medal, 2014 SF Chronicle Wine Competition

Recognition

References

Companies based in Placer County, California
Wineries in California